Bryant Olcher Fedden (17 July 1930 - 19 March 2004) was a self-taught letter-cutter, glass engraver and sculptor who developed his craft in a workshop environment with craftspeople whom he taught and supported. He was a member of the Gloucestershire Guild of Craftsmen for more than forty years. He was a founder member of the Letter Exchange, a professional organisation promoting lettering in all its forms. Bryant Fedden has work in the Victoria and Albert Museum Collections.

Bryant Fedden went to Bryanstone School and followed that with two years in National Service. He then went up to Clare College, Cambridge University where he read history.  Bryant married Kate in 1955 and they then taught English in Pakistan. Bryant Fedden then taught history at Gordenstoun School in Scotland. They then made the decision to change careers and set up a letter cutting and sculpture workshop in Toddington, Gloucestershire. The workshop gained commissions including a memorial plaque for the Waller era architects for Gloucester Cathedral in 1961.

In 1966 Bryant Fedden moved his workshop to Winchcombe, Gloucestershire in part to be closer to Winchcombe Pottery and its manager, the potter Ray Finch. The number of people working at the workshop increased and included Kate Fedden who took on some of the commissioned glass engraving. Notable works by Bryant Fedden at this time included the gates and railings for Tewksbury Abbey, with Keith Jameson, in 1968;  the Ivor Gurney Memorial Plaque in Gloucester Cathedral in 1976 and the memorial plaque to Sylvanus Lysons in Gloucester Cathedral in 1989.

Bryant Fedden then moved to Littledean, Forest of Dean, Gloucestershire and together with wife Kate Fedden (glass engraving), his son Matthew Fedden (artist-blacksmith) and his son-in-law Paul Harper (furniture maker) set up a multi-functioning workshop. Bryant Fedden's notable works from this time include a viewing platform plaque of a short poem by Robin Munro carved in stained oak for the National Garden Festival in Gateshead in 1990; the carved grave stone for his friend Li Yuan-Chia, the renowned Chinese artist, poet and curator in 1994 and the public art Memorial to Littledean Dairymen in Littledean, Gloucestershire in 2000.

In 2002, Gloucester Cathedral hosted an exhibition of works from Bryant Fedden's various workshops entitled "40 Years of Bryant Fedden Workshops: A Celebration".

Education 

Bryant Fedden attended Bryanstone School from 1944 - 1948 where he was taught by the sculptor and potter Donald Potter. In Fiona MacCarthy's The Guardian obituary for Potter she included a description of Potter's experiments in earthenware: 

"[Potter] had constructed the wood-fired kiln for earthenware himself, and there are many memories among ex-pupils of staying up for all-night firings, drinking beer and cider while Potter reminisced and quoted William Blake. Those pupils included the distinguished potters Richard Batterham and Mike Dodd, the artist Richard Bawden, the sculptor and lettercutter Bryant Fedden and the architects Richard Burton and Quinlan Terry.".

From 1950 Bryant Fedden read history and English at  Clare College, Cambridge University.

National Service 

Bryant Fedden took part in National Service in Nigeria from 1948 to1950 achieving the rank of 2nd Lieutenant on 24 September 1949.

Teaching experience 
Bryant Fedden married Kate in March 1955. He and Kate then moved to Pakistan to teach English from 1955 - 1958.

Bryant Fedden taught history at Gordenstoun School from 1958 - 1961.

In 1976 Bryant Fedden was invited to teach glass engraving for a year at Morely College, London.

Early works 
Bryant Fedden created work from his first year at Bryanstone School. Lesley Greene describes Bryant Fedden's "Carved Bison", made at age 14, in her forward to the "40 Years of Bryant Fedden Workshops: A Celebration" exhibition catalogue: "the spirit of the 'bison-ness' of the creature is wonderful."

The Bryant Fedden Workshops 
The following is an introduction to the various workshops that Bryant Fedden set up during his working life.

Toddington Workshop 1961–1966 
Bryant Fedden set up his first workshop in a house in Toddington, Gloucestershire.

Workshop member 
Bryant Fedden

Publications 
On 11 October 1966 the Birmingham Daily Post carried an article entitled "Display of craftsmanship" which featured an exhibition at the Department of Architecture and Planning Hall in Coventry. "Bryant Fedden of Toddington near Cheltenham" together with John Makepeace,  Ann Sutton and others had been invited to take part by the Crafts Council of Great Britain and Coventry Corporation. An unnamed representative of the Crafts Council was quoted in the article: "Care was taken...to include only exhibits that demonstrated the relevance and value of craft techniques in an industrial society."

Tan Yard Bank Workshop – Winchcombe 1966 to 1990 
In 1966 Bryant Fedden set up his second workshop at Tan Yard Bank in Winchcombe, Gloucestershire.

Workshop members 
Bryant Fedden, Kate Fedden, Keith Jameson, Steve Marchant

The Bryant Fedden Slate 
In the summer of 1969, David Palmer, a counsellor at UCLA and his family were touring the Cotswolds in England when they were directed to Bryant Fedden's Tan Yard Bank workshop by an owner of one of his name plate works. David Palmer was given a tour of the workshop by Bryant Fedden. It was during this tour that David Palmer saw an alphabet slate and in his words "I fell in love with it". David Palmer could not afford to buy it but Bryant Fedden said that he could take it and perhaps find a buyer for it. David Palmer placed the slate in his touring van and then carried it onto the plane back to the USA. On arrival the slate was initially put on display at the UCLA Student Bookstore and then, after a period in storage, was moved to the School of Library Service at UCLA in the Powell Library basement. It was on display in the Horn Press Chappel a group developed to utilise letter presses as part of a "Typography and the Graphic Arts" course developed by Professor Andrew H. Horn. David Palmer published a small pamphlet cataloguing the journey of the slate from Winchcombe to UCLA entitled "The Bryant Fedden Slate: : Its Journey from Gloucestershire to the UCLA Library School" and used the Horn Press facilities to print it. In 1992 the School of Library Service now named Graduate School of Library and Information Science moved to a new smaller building and the Horn Press Chappel was disbanded and the slate was moved to the Graduate School of Library and Information Science.  In 1994 the Graduate School of Library and Information Science was incorporated into the UCLA Graduate School of Education and Information Studies (GSEIS).

Tan Yard Bank Gallery

Publications 
A photograph of an engraved glass decanter by Bryant Fedden featured in an article entitled "If your route is around the Cotswolds...a chance to look in on the rural craftsmen" in The Daily Telegraph on 10 August 1972. The article detailed information relating to that year's Guild of Gloucestershire Craftsmen Exhibition at Painswick, Gloucestershire. Note: The Guild changed their name to the Gloucestershire Guild of Craftsmen in 1984.

Bryant Fedden featured in the January 1973 edition of Gloucestershire Life magazine. In the first of a series  on Gloucestershire Craftsmanship, the article by N. Large, included the following from Bryant Fedden on his ideal: 

"My ideal is a craft workshop, embracing individuals with different skills, and so forming a pool of ability that can attempt any commission."

On 15 June 1973, The Guardian ran an article entitled "West Country Craft" detailing an exhibition by the Guild of Gloucestershire Craftsmen at Foyles Art Gallery in London. In her article Hazel Shaw included the following: "...perhaps the highlight of the exhibition is the work of two associates: Bryant Fedden and Keith Jameson. Their work really holds the full flavour of rural Britain. Between them they are capable of working to a high standard in an incredible range of materials." Bryant Fedden was interviewed by Shaw and offers both a view of the way he and Keith Jameson were working then and their aspirations too:

"We like challenges, and we don't get enough of them. At the moment we don't feel extended. So often people want to use our workmanship to make replicas of something they saw in Harrods. We want the chance to be craftsmen of 1973...Sometimes people are prepared to pay up to £200 for a carved gravestone. We try to persuade them to erect a piece of sculpture instead, or a bench made of lovely reddish ironstone, or a fountain for the whole community to remember the deceased by."

In 1976 Barrie & Jenkins published Geoffery Beard's International Modern Glass. The book featured two works by Bryant Fedden: an engraved plate glass door with abstract design and a Dartington glass plate engraved with the alphabet.

Marcus Binney and Peter Burman produced a report on the role of churches and cathedrals with regard to the British tourist industry in 1977. Their report included the following:

"The new Roman Catholic cathedrals of Liverpool and Clifton (Bristol) have attracted a good deal of attention and many visitors, and in both cases the furnishing and decoration of the building has been made the occasion for commissioning major works of art from artists of the calibre of Elizabeth Frink, Patrick Reyntiens, Simon Verity and Bryant Fedden. This is a trend and a welcome one..."

The Bryant Fedden Slate: Its Journey from Gloucestershire to the UCLA Library School was written by David Palmer with photography by Robert D. Hayes and first published in 1977.

In the accompanying catalogue for the "Festival '80" exhibition of The Guild of Glass Engravers there was a direct quote from Bryant Fedden describing his practice: 

"I engrave glass with a flexible drive and being a sculptor and letter cutter have found great satisfaction in using glass as a medium for engraving lettering and abstract designs."

In 1980 John Lancaster published a book on lettering entitled Lettering Techniques which featured the work of Bryant Fedden at the time of the Tan Yard Bank Workshop. In the book Lancaster used Bryant Fedden's work as an exemplar regarding "incised lettering". He described Fedden as follows:  

"[H]e has developed, through personal experience and trial and error an individual approach to this important aspect of the visual arts that exudes a deeply felt sensitivity to pattern and form and a seemingly natural ability to combine these as a total visual experience with his selected materials."

Also in 1980 Who's Who in Art included Bryant Fedden as a "...glass engraver and letter cutter in glass, stone and wood."

Isabelle Anscombe's article in The Times, 16 May 1981, entitled "Collecting: Letters mean so much" covered "The Art of the Scribe" Exhibition by The Society of Scribes and Illuminators. In the article she included the following quote regarding Bryant Fedden's practice:

"In stone and glass Bryant Fedden uses the incursion of the hard edge of letters in a three-dimensional manner very different from the graphic effects gained by David Kindersley or, more decoratively, by Simon Verity. His large, wide cut letters score the surface, diving into the stone rather than remaining on the surface. He even produces three-dimensional stone letters, comfortably hand-sized; a curled up "e" proved to be primordially satisfying to hold."

In 1986 The Well Furnished Garden by Michael Balston was published by Simon & Schuster. The book featured Bryant Fedden's "set of three seats in Horton stone and a low table in Horton stone" created in the Tan Yard Bank workshop.

Also in 1986 the Taplinger Publishing Company, New York published Contemporary Calligraphy: Modern Scribes and Lettering Artists II edited by Peter Halliday. Bryant Fedden's glass goblet with monograph, created with flexible drive engraving, featured in the book.

"The Spirit of the Letter" exhibition at Portsmouth City Museum and Art Gallery 1989 was accompanied by an exhibition brochure that  included short profiles on each of the participants of the group of exhibitors. Bryant Fedden's profile included the following:

"Bryant Fedden was born in 1930 and brought up in Devon. They cut and colour inscriptions in stone and in wood, and engrave window glass and presentation glass.

In March 2013, Dr. Paul Harper submitted a PhD thesis at London Metropolitan University entitled Doing and Talking: The Value of Video Interviewing for Researching and Theorising Craft. Harper's "Biographical Preface" included the following about his experiences of Bryant Fedden during his time at the Tan Yard Bank Workshop:

"My first encounter with craft was through my father-in-law, the stone carver and letter cutter, Bryant Fedden. Bryant's work demonstrated very fine workmanship. His letterforms were exact and precisely executed, but they also had a lightness, or "bounce" as he called it, that contributed to a lovely sense of balance and harmony. This was partly acheived by carving directly, with minimal drawing out, so that the letters were realised from the start as carved 3-dimensional forms. He exemplified a certain notion of craft as skilful making but what attracted me most about the model of craft that he represented to me was its holistic nature. The standard that he aspired to in his carving reflected an aspiration towards integrity in the rest of his life. His workshop was close to the house, and was the focal point for a network of relationships: familial, social, and business. Bryant's practice was at the centre of a lifestyle that was socially and politically engaged, in which work and home, aesthetics and politics, a reflective interior life, and an outward-looking sense of community were part of a whole."

Dean Croft Workshop - Littledean - 1990 to 2004 
In 1990 Bryant Fedden set up his third and final workshop at Dean Croft, LIttledean, Forest of Dean, Gloucestershire.

Workshop members 

Bryant Fedden, Matt Baker, Li Yuan-Chia, Kate Fedden, Matthew Fedden, Paul Harper.

Dean Croft Workshop Gallery

Publications 
On 23 July 1994 The Daily Telegraph carried a feature on the Gloucester Guild of Craftsmen Annual Exhibition in Painswick Centre, then known as the Painswick Institute. Paul Barker's article entitled "Antiques of the Future" included the following: "...in the meadow, behind the tithe barn, the letter cutter Bryant Fedden had a delicate stone fountain on display, with "Watershed" carved vertically up the pedestal. A garden seat, handy for any arbour, bore the epigraph "Look Out".

The catalogue for the 10th Anniversary Exhibition for the Letter Exchange in 1998 featured a short profile of Bryant Fedden and the following direct quote he talks of the practice of the Dean Croft Workshop:

"I work in a collection of workshops, furniture-making, blacksmithying, printmaking and letter-cutting. It is a bubble of excitement; ideas and designs, problems and crises are shared and whenever possible the family, for we all are related, work together designing and making objects which we hope are exciting."

The Times newspaper of 13 April 1998 carried an article by Jim McClue that featured the above Letter Exchange exhibition. In it McClue included the following: 

"LETTER EXCHANGE - a society of artists working with alphabets - is ten years old. Its celebratory exhibition is full of mastery, yet vibrantly alive. Whether cutting memorials in slate or brushing letters on vellum, these are alpha craftsmen and world betas. Bryant Fedden's Pine Alphabet Box and Pat Chaloner's glass quotations caught my iota, but there is something here for anyone interested in writing, art or design."

Simplicity or Splendour: Arts and Crafts Living: Objects from the Cheltenham Collections (1999), edited by Annette Carruthers and Mary Greensted, features a detailed description of the commemorative plaque produced by Bryant Fedden for the Wilson Gallery, Cheltenham. Bryant Fedden's profile includes the following: 

"Bryant Fedden is a...local maker and is also a life member of the Gloucestershire Guild of Craftsmen. He is well known for his elegant lettering on glass and other materials...Fedden is a self-taught letter cutter and sculptor...Now based in Littledean in the Forest of Dean, Gloucestershire, Fedden works mainly to commission from architects, institutions and individuals and does much work for churches and cathedrals."

The Letter Exchange journal Forum carried a profile of Bryant Fedden in the autumn of 2001. Jon Gibbs interviewed Bryant Fedden and included the following: 

"There is a sense of playfulness in Bryant's lettering. A delight in intertwining and linking letters to create new shapes and juxtapositions: an intense pleasure in arranging letters and words to play on meanings - to make visual the playfulness of such meanings, and to make the reader/viewer think a little deeper than the surface."

In 2007 Crowood Press published The Art of Letter Cutting in Stone by Tom Perkins. Bryant Fedden and the Dean Croft workshop are profiled in the book and Perkins included the following quote:

"In Gloucestershire Bryant Fedden sculptor, letter cutter in stone and wood, and glass engraver, ran a very successful workshop for over forty years, working with a range of other craftspeople, including his wife, Kate, producing an extensive range of commissioned work and inspiring a number of people to work and live as craftsmen. He was one of the first of his generation to work more freely with carved letterforms, sometimes even carving single three-dimensional letters as pieces of sculpture."

In 2009 the Dunfries and Galloway Life Magazine had a feature on Matt Baker entitled "Art Attack". In the article Baker looks back at his experiences of Bryant Fedden at the time of the Dean Croft workshop:

"I was introduced to Bryant Fedden, who was a sculptor and letter cutter," he says. "He quite literally saved me. I wasn't going anywhere with anything and I did a traditional apprenticeship under him. He could do amazing things with wood and invented his own alphabet. He taught me to do letter cutting, saying that if I couldn't make a living as a sculptor at least I could  always make a living doing gravestones. He was a generous man, and taught me what it was to live the life of an artist."

Exhibitions 

The Lane Gallery, Bradford was the location for a joint exhibition from 13 May - 15 June 1965 entitled "Tapestries by Theo Moorman: Letter cutting by Bryant Fedden".

The Society of Designer Craftsmen held an exhibition at the Commonwealth Institute Art Gallery in 4 June – 29 June 1969 entitled "Crafts '69" in which an engraved goblet entitled "Oracle" by Bryant Fedden was included - price £38. This goblet subsequently became part of the Victoria and Albert Museum Collections. Bryant Fedden also exhibited in the Glass Category: a window panel - engraved and applied glass - price £100; Goblet - abstract design - engraved glass - price £18; goblet with quotation from La Fontaine - engraved glass - price £20; Decanter & six sherry glasses - abstract design- engraved glass - price £45 and in the Lettering Category: "Dynamited" - Hornton Stone (3 panels) - price £75. The exhibition was opened by David Pye.

"The Craftsman's Art", an exhibition organised by the Crafts Advisory Committee was held at the Victoria and Albert Museum, London, from 15 March - 13 May 1973. Bryant Fedden submitted two works which were accepted for the exhibition: a wheel engraved plate and a topograph in Welsh grey slate, made for a Worcestershire County Council picnic site and, presented by Sir Gordon Russell in memory of his brother Donald Russell.

As a member of the Gloucestershire Guild of Craftsmen Bryant Fedden regularly exhibited his, and his colleagues work at the annual Gloucestershire Guild of Craftsmen Exhibition at the Painswick Centre, Painswick and other locations. For example, in June 1973, The Guild held an exhibition at the Foyles Art Gallery, now known as the Gallery at Foyles, in London. This exhibition was designed and mounted by Bryant Fedden.

Bryant Fedden (glass engraving) and Kit Barker (painting) had a joint exhibition at the Oxford Gallery, Oxford in December 1976.

The Society of Designer Craftsmen held an exhibition in the Assembly Rooms, York from 26 July to 6 August 1977. Bryant Fedden exhibited a carved green slate entitled "Adam & Eve" and an engraved glass cylinder inscribed "Oh don't mistreat the fly" and Kate Fedden exhibited a glass cylinder engraved with a Peregrine Falcon and six glass goblets engraved with a Dartford Warbler, a Nuthatch, a Tree Creeper, a Wren, a Crested Tit and a Great Tit respectively.

The "Take a Letter: Craftsmen and Lettering Today" touring exhibition went to London, Bangor and Cardiff during the course of 1979. The exhibition was organised by the British Crafts Centre and the Welsh Crafts Council with support by the Crafts Council. It featured one of the engraved arched windows, by Bryant Fedden, installed in The Chapter House, Bristol Cathedral the following year.

Bryant Fedden contributed to the "Festival Glass '80" exhibition by The Guild of Glass Engravers, which took place at the Church of Saint Lawrence Jewry-by-Guildhall from 7 - 19 July 1980.

"The Art of the Scribe" exhibition of The Society of Scribes and Illuminators in 1981 featured a carved stone 'e' by Bryant Fedden.

The Guild of Gloucestershire Craftsmen had an exhibition at Schaager Waapen gallery in Alkmaar, Netherlands from May - June 1981. It featured work by Betty Blandino, Bryant Fedden, Kate Fedden, Ray Finch, Rodney Forss, Ann James, Keith Jameson, Mary Noble and Theo Moorman.

Bryant Fedden exhibited examples of his lettering along with Phil Rodgers' ceramics at the National Museum of Wales in January and February 1982.

Kate Fedden exhibited glass engravings at the National Museum of Wales, Cardiff from 1 May - 31 July 1982.

The "Prophecy and Vision" exhibition took place across the Arnolfini, Bristol and Camden Arts Centre in 1983. Bryant Fedden exhibited his "Hanging Cross" in Christchurch, Cheltenham. His profile in the accompanying exhibition catalogue included the following: 

"I am very interested in the sculptural form of letters and believe that three-dimensional lettering and random lettering are forms that need to be explored much further, both in stone and engraved on glass, especially when used on buildings."

Bryant Fedden's lettering was included in a group exhibition entitled "The Spirit of the Letter: A Celebration of Lettering and Calligraphy in Britain Today" in Portsmouth City Museum & Art Gallery from 12 September - 12 November 1989. Other exhibitors at the exhibition included Michael Harvey, Alec Peever and Stephen Raw.

The Letter Exchange held an exhibition entitled "Letters of the Alphabet" in January and February 1994. Members  of the Letter Exchange were asked to supply their take on individual letters. Bryant Fedden exhibited two Portland stone U's interconnected.

"Exhibition of Fine Craft" was the name given to a show at Cyril Wood Court, Bere Regis, Dorset between 19 September and 2 October 1994. The exhibition featured work by Bryant Fedden (Letter Cutter), Kate Fedden (Printmaker), Matt Fedden (Blacksmith), Paul Harper (Furniture Maker) and Tabitha Fedden (Printmaker).

The Letter Exchange held a 10th Anniversary Exhibition at the Morley Gallery, London from 20 April - 14 May 1998. The exhibition featured a stained pine alphabet box by Bryant Fedden.

The 40 Years of Bryant Fedden Workshops: A Celebration exhibition was held at Gloucester Cathedral from 6 July - 20 July 2002. The exhibition catalogue had a forward by Lesley Greene which included the following quote:

"This exhibition is intended to celebrate not only Bryant Fedden's distinguished career as a sculptor and letter-cutter but also the significant role he played in encouraging and shaping the development of other artists and craftspeople though the workshops that he established in Winchcombe and in Littledean. This generosity with his time and his support for others typifies Bryant's approach to his work. Work which has been made in the context of a life well lived, and, beautifully conceived and made as it is, it is not precious. It was not made for the art museum, but rather to be in the world. Bryant's work was largely commissioned, whether for private homes, churches or public spaces, to form the backdrop to people's lives. While this might suggest a proper sense of modesty, there is no false humility about the work which quietly asserts itself through the sureness of the forms and the qualities of craftsmanship. This confident craftsmanship both belies and allows for a certain lightness of touch, and often a playfulness and sense of humour."

In May 2003 Bryant Fedden and his son Matthew Fedden took part in the "Spring into Life!" exhibition at Hay Farm, Cliffords Mense, Gloucestershire.

The Gloucester Guild of Craftsmen celebrated their 80th Anniversary with an exhibition at The Beacon Hall, The Painswick Centre, Painswick, between 15 - 18 August 2013. The Cheltenham art e.bulletin featured the exhibition and included the following:

"To continue the celebrations of our 80th Anniversary year there will be an exhibition looking back at some of the Guild's internationally renowned members such as Bryant Fedden and Gerry Carter."

Institutional memberships 

Bryant Fedden joined the Gloucester Guild of Craftsmen in 1962.

He was a brother of the Artworkers Guild 1971 - 2004.

Bryant Fedden was a member of the South West Arts' Visual Arts and Crafts Advisory Panel

In 1988 Bryant Fedden was a founder member of the Letter Exchange, a network to support those working in calligraphy, lettering and typography.

In Memoriam Award 
In 2005 The Gloucestershire Guild of Craftsmen created a Bryant Fedden Award Scheme to support artists and craftspeople at the beginning of their careers. Craftspeople supported through the Bryant Fedden Award Scheme include: Sarah Pearson Cooke, Matthew Tradgett, Emily-Kriste Wilcox and Tim Parry-Williams

References

External Links 
Further information can be obtained regarding Bryant Fedden's works at Gloucester Cathedral via the Gloucester Cathedral Library and by contacting the Gloucester Cathedral Library Archivist: archivist (at) gloucestercathedral.org.uk

Further reading 
Harper, Paul,  "Bryant Fedden Obituary", Forum: Newsletter of Letter Exchange, Issue 8, September 2004, p. 9.

1930 births
British sculptors

2004 deaths